FK Bregalnica Golak Delčevo is a football club based in Delčevo, North Macedonia. They are currently competing in the Macedonian Third League (East Division).

History
The club was founded in 2012 as Bregalnica Golak, after the dissolution of the club with same name, as no sponsor wanted to help. Legally, the two clubs' track records and honours are kept separate by the Football Federation of North Macedonia.

Supporters
Bregalnica Delčevo supporters are called Aramii.

References

External links
Official website 
Bregalnica Golak Facebook 
Club info at MacedonianFootball 
Football Federation of Macedonia 

Bregalnica Delcevo
Association football clubs established in 2012
2012 establishments in the Republic of Macedonia
Delčevo Municipality